Michael Egan (28 February 1866 – 3 March 1947) was an Irish trade unionist and politician.

A coach-builder by trade, his public career started when he was comparatively young, and he became an advocate of the workers of Cork and a driving force in establishing and maintaining trade unionism in the city — often against strong opposition. For several years he was chairman of the Cork Workers Council, and was vice-president and then president of the Cork United Trades from 1904 to 1907, and again in 1913.

In 1908 he was elected to the Cork Corporation, and was active locally on the portfolios of Law, Finance, and Public Works.

He was a member of the National Executive of the Irish Trade Union Congress and Labour Party, and represented the labour movement on the Anti-Conscription Committee which sat in Dublin during World War I with fellow members Éamon de Valera, Arthur Griffith and John Dillon.

Following the resignation of his colleague Alfred O'Rahilly, Egan was elected at a by-election in 1924 to Dáil Éireann as a Cumann na nGaedheal Teachta Dála (TD), sitting for the remainder of the 4th Dáil. He was not re-elected at the June 1927 general election.

He continued his involvement however in Irish politics and was president of the Cork branch of Cumann na nGaedheal from 1928 to 1930. Active in public life in Cork into later years, he was a member of the Cork Harbour Board, and Cork Vocational Education Committee.

Michael Egan married Annie Brennan in 1899, and had four children. He died in the North Infirmary Cork, in March 1947 aged 81.

References

External links
 National Library of Ireland - Manuscripts attributed to Michael Egan

1866 births
1947 deaths
Cumann na nGaedheal TDs
Politicians from County Cork
Members of the 4th Dáil